The Dubai Motor Festival is a festival launched by the Department of Tourism and Commerce Marketing of Dubai in 2013. According to sources around 500 cars were paraded at the festival in a bid to promote tourism in the region.

References

Auto shows in the United Arab Emirates